Eugenio Rubino (born 20 August 1916) was an Italian diplomat. He was called "one of the most prestigious sons of the city Trapani."

Biography
Eugenio Rubino was born on 20 August 1916 in Trapani, on the west coast of Sicily, in Italy.

He became a diplomat in the 1950s. He was Italian Ambassador to Philippines, an office which he held from 1961 until 1966.

He then became Italian Ambassador to Thailand, an office which he kept from 1969 until 1972. On 27 February 1972 he was appointed Italian Ambassador to Vietnam, keeping this office until 1975.

Rubino was nominated Italian Ambassador to Uganda on 10 March 1977. He arrived in Uganda in March 1977, presenting his credentials to Idi Amin on 18 March 1977. During his mission to Uganda, he initially resided in Kampala. He held this office until 1981.

He went out of service on 1 September 1981.

In the 1990s he founded the Associazione degli ex studenti del Liceo classico Ximenes in Trapani, Italy.

References

Ambassadors of Italy to Thailand
Ambassadors of Italy to Uganda
Ambassadors of Italy to Vietnam
Italian diplomats
People from Trapani
1916 births
Year of death missing